Education Committee may refer to:
 Education Committee (Iceland), a standing committee of the Icelandic parliament
 Education Committee (Sweden), a standing committee of the Riksdag
 Education Select Committee, a standing committee of the Parliament of the United Kingdom
 Gedo Education Committee, a service organization based in Gedo, Somalia

See also 
 Committee for Education of the Northern Ireland Assembly